Biagio Rossetti ( 1447 – 1516) was an Italian architect and urbanist from Ferrara. A military engineer since 1483, and the ducal architect of Ercole I d'Este, in 1492 Rossetti was assigned the project of enlarging the city of Ferrara.

Rossetti is considered the first architect in the history of urbanistics to make use of the advantages of the modern methods: balancing the humanistic principles in architecture, the real needs of the city, and local traditions. Beginning in 1492, he projected and directed construction of the defense walls around the city. The Diamond Palace is perhaps the most famous of his buildings.

After Ercole's death  in 1505, Rossetti served the Cardinal Ippolito d'Este, in which role he was responsible for the creation of many notable palazzi and churches. Among the latter, he helped design Santa Maria in Vado.

Sources

1440s births
1516 deaths
Architects from Ferrara
15th-century Italian architects
16th-century Italian architects
Italian Renaissance architects
Italian urban planners